Puya prosanae is a species in the genus Puya. This species is endemic to Bolivia.

References

prosanae
Flora of Bolivia